The 2022 Uttarakhand Legislative Assembly election have elected the incumbent fifth Uttarakhand Legislative Assembly. Elections were held on 14 February 2022 when Bharatiya Janata Party emerged as the single largest party with 47 seats in the 70-seat legislature and formed the government. The Indian National Congress with 19 seats served as the opposition.

Notable Positions

Composition of the Assembly

Members of Legislative Assembly

See also
 2022 Uttarakhand Legislative Assembly election
 Second Dhami ministry
 Politics of Uttarakhand

References

Uttarakhand Legislative Assembly
Uttarakhand